Events from the year 1668 in Sweden

Incumbents
 Monarch – Charles XI

Events

 January – The Triple Alliance of 1668 is formed between England, Sweden and the United Provinces.
 The first National Bank in Europe (the Riksbank) is founded in Stockholm, Sweden.
 Östgöta Nation, Lund is founded.

Births

 
 

 Sven Andersson (farmworker)  (died 1691)

Deaths

References

 
Years of the 17th century in Sweden
Sweden